is a manga series written and illustrated by Masahiko Nakahira. The story follows Sakura Kasugano in her quest to become a street fighter and meet Ryu.

Characters 

The main character of this story.  Introduced in Nakahira's Street Fighter Alpha Vol. 2, Sakura becomes obsessed with the world of street fighting as well as becoming Ryu's self-proclaimed "No. 1 fan".  While young and inexperienced at fighting, Sakura displays great physical ability as well as a strong aptitude for learning fighting techniques, recreating Ryu's hadōken, shōryūken, and tatsumaki-senpūkyaku after only seeing them a few times (albeit Sakura's versions are highly modified and arguably weaker).

Sakura's grouchy and irritable younger brother.  Tsukushi is obsessed with playing video games and is seen playing Final Fight and Street Fighter II (against none other than Blanka himself) in the story.  Sakura makes her street fighting debut against a very large student who stole Tsukushi's friend's copy of Final Fight. He can also be seen in the background of Sakura's stage in Street Fighter Alpha 2 playing video games inside the house.

Sakura's best friend.  While she is your average schoolgirl (into boys and clothes while utterly opposed to Sakura's hobby of street fighting), she (reluctantly) accompanies Sakura on her quest to become the greatest street fighter.

Sakura's self-proclaimed teacher. While still a comical blowhard, Dan is actually depicted to be a capable fighter in this manga, although he can still be easily defeated by more intimidating fighters such as Balrog or Zangief. After Sakura's meeting with Sagat, he stays behind as she moves on, challenging Sagat and declaring that he's there to avenge his father. The fight is never seen, and the outcome remains unknown.

Karin is the heir to the super-rich Kanzuki family (whose compound stretches across 200 miles), yet attends the local high school to "observe the lifestyles of the less fortunate".  Following her family's code, "In all things, be victorious", Karin challenges Sakura to a match and loses, thus leading Karin to instigate a fighting tournament across the prefecture of Setagaya. Sakura Ganbaru! is actually Karin's first appearance in any Street Fighter media, later becoming a playable character in Street Fighter Alpha 3.

An employee of the Kanzuki family, and Karin's personal steward. He drives her to and from school, arranges her meals (she won't eat school cafeteria food), does background research on anyone she takes interest in (even straying into the TMI territory), and other odd jobs. While concerned for her welfare, especially in regards to her interest in street fighting, he is nonetheless in awe of her abilities as a martial artist and as the heir of the Kanzuki zaibatsu.

Secretly entering the tournament under the alias of a young girl by the name of "Aoki" (each tournament participant carries a badge which sends tracking information to the Kanzuki zaibatsu, Ken supplied false data).  Ken Masters makes short work of his opponents, defeating many including Dan and Karin. His final opponent is Sakura, who, much to everyone's surprise (especially Ken's), gives him a very tough fight. However he defeats her and wins the tournament.

Sakura's idol. After rescuing Sakura from Bison in Volume 2 of the Street Fighter Alpha manga, Sakura is determined to meet Ryu to have a match with him. Towards the end of the Volume 2, Sakura finally finds him and challenges him to a fight, the end of which is never seen, though its implied that either Ryu won or it was a draw, though the former is most likely. At the very end, he and Ken appear before an older Sakura, now a gym teacher (which Ken comments as being "so like her"), and the two begin to spar.

Volumes 
Sakura Ganbaru! has been released in tankōbon and kanzenban formats.

Tankōbon
  (Released in February 1997)
  (Released in August 1997)

The kanzenban was published by Shueisha in January 2004. It was followed by a larger-format re-edition in April 2007.

Sakura Ganbaru! was also released in English by Udon Entertainment in a translation of the tankōbon edition, released in September 2007. These editions had slightly edited covers, altering Sakura's skirt so that her bloomers were no longer visible, as they were on the Japanese editions.

External links 
 

Sakura Ganbaru!
1996 manga